Robert Hutton (4 December 1872 – 9 July 1920) was a British sport shooter. Competing for Great Britain, he won a bronze medal in team trap shooting at the 1908 Summer Olympics in London.

References

1872 births
1920 deaths
British male sport shooters
Olympic shooters of Great Britain
Olympic bronze medallists for Great Britain
Shooters at the 1908 Summer Olympics
Medalists at the 1908 Summer Olympics
Place of birth missing
Olympic medalists in shooting
20th-century British people